McLain is an unincorporated community in Harvey County, Kansas, United States.  Various maps and documents have listed the name as McLain, McLains, McLain's, and McClain.  It is located a few miles southeast of Newton at the intersection of SE 36th St and S Woodlawn Rd.

History
McLain had a post office from 1886 until 1906.

The community was located along the Missouri Pacific Railroad line between Newton and Whitewater, but the track was abandoned in 2003.

Geography
McLain is located at coordinates 37.9994558, -97.2630907 in the state of Kansas.

Education
The community is served by Newton USD 373 public school district.

References

Further reading

External links
 Harvey County Maps: Current, Historic, KDOT

Unincorporated communities in Harvey County, Kansas
Unincorporated communities in Kansas